Methyldesorphine is an opioid analgesic. First synthesized in Germany in 1940 and patented in the US in 1952, it has a high potential for abuse as with any potent opioid agonist, and is sometimes found along with desomorphine as a component of the home-made opioid mixture known as "Krokodil" used in Russia and the neighboring former Soviet republics. It is approximately 15 times more potent than morphine as an analgesic but if the 6-7 bond is saturated, the β isomer is some 50 times more potent than morphine.

Methyldesorphine is listed as a Schedule I Narcotic controlled substance under the Controlled Substances Act 1970 in the United States with a DEA ACSCN of 9302 and zero annual aggregate manufacturing quota.  The free base conversion ratio of the hydrochloride is 0.89.

See also 
 6-Methylenedihydrodesoxymorphine

References 

4,5-Epoxymorphinans
Ethers
Mu-opioid receptor agonists
Opioids
Phenols
Semisynthetic opioids